Walter Oelert (born 14 July 1942) is a professor at the Juelich Research Center in Germany.

Research 
In 1995 under the leadership of Professor Walter Oelert, the international group of physicists in the CERN laboratory managed to show that they had obtained experimentally nine atoms of antihydrogen in a particle accelerator. Later research allowed the CERN scientists to collect anti-protons among low-energy positrons until they combine into anti-atoms and store them at very low temperatures.

References

External links 
Walter Oelert's Personal page
Interview with Oelert (Cern Courier)
Scientific publications of Walter Oelert on INSPIRE-HEP

20th-century German physicists
People associated with CERN
1942 births
Living people